Kanakapura is a city in the Ramanagara district of Karnataka on the banks of the Arkavathi river and the administrative center of the taluk of the same name. Previously belonged to Bangalore Rural District. It was formerly the largest constituency in the country. The taluk is very widespread. It is located among the lush green forests of the state of Karnataka. The town is a tourism hotspot and an often visited tourist favorite in the entire state of Karnataka, as it has something for everyone ranging from avid trekkers to history buffs and wildlife enthusiasts.The forest area in this taluk is very wide and about half of the Bannerghatta National Park is located in our Kanakapura area.Kodihalli wildlife range and harohalli wildlife range its division.The Kaveri Wildlife Sanctuary consists of two main zones namely the Sangam Wildlife range, the Mugur Wildlife range

Geography 

NH 209 (Bangalore – Coimbatore) passes via Kanakapura.

Demographics 
 India census, Kanakapura had a population of 47,047. Males constitute 52% of the population and females 48%. Kanakapura has an average literacy rate of 76%, higher than the national average of 59.5%: male literacy is 72%, and female literacy is 59%. In Kanakapura, 11% of the population is under 6 years of age. Now Kanakapura is City Municipality Council.
Kanakapura has 6 Hobli's each located approximately 16.5 from Kanakapura town.

As of the 2011 India census, Kanakapura had a population of 54014 individuals. The average literacy rate stood at 81.08%.

Languages 
Kannada is the only language spoken here and it's official language.

Educational Institutions 
Rural educational society is one of the oldest educational institute in Kanakapura,The other schools that are in Kanakapura are St Michel's English School, Podar International School, 
Blossom School,  Jain International Residential School, Jain Vidyaniketan, Jain Public School and many other schools.

The universities that are currently present are Jain University and Dayananda Sagar Medical College (under construction)

References

External links 

 Official website of Bangalore Rural District
 Official website of Kanakapura Town
 Prestige Primrose Hills
 Godrej Park Retreat
Cities and towns in Ramanagara district